The Magic Kingdom Parade is a large theatrical presentation at the Magic Kingdom in Walt Disney World which dates back to the beginning of the theme park. .

The early "character parades" were simple in execution, featuring Mickey Mouse leading the Walt Disney World Band, followed by a group of Disney characters, performers, and musicians walking or riding vehicles along the parade route. As the years went on, the parades became composed of many floats.

As of March 12, 2020, Festival of Fantasy and Move it! Shake it! Mouskedance it! had their final performances due to the COVID-19 pandemic.

The Festival of Fantasy Parade returned to the Magic Kingdom on March 9, 2022 after being closed due to the Covid 19 Pandemic.

History

Current parades  

The Festival of Fantasy Parade has resumed operation. The most recent iteration features a reduced slate of performers and no longer includes the Brave (2012 film) unit. Current parade offerings also include Mickey's Celebration Cavalcade featuring Mickey Mouse and friends, and the Disney Adventure Friends Cavalcade featuring a variety of Disney and Pixar characters, including Moana, Merida and The Incredibles.

Former parades 
 Character Parade (October 1 – December 9, 1971)
 Cavalcade of Characters (1974–1975, 1977–1978)
 Move It! Shake It! Dance and Play it! Street Party (February 12, 2009 – December 1, 2018): Formerly named Move It! Shake It! Celebrate It! (Renamed in Fall 2014)
 Move it! Shake it! Mousekedance it! (January 18, 2019 – March 12, 2020)

References

External links 

 

Magic Kingdom
Walt Disney Parks and Resorts parades